The Chery Tiggo 8 is a series of three-row mid-size crossover SUV produced by Chery under the Tiggo product series. A more premium variant called the Tiggo 8 Plus was launched in 2020 while being marketed as the Tiggo 8 Pro in overseas markets. Another newer premium variant called the Tiggo 8 Pro was introduced to the Chinese market for the 2022 model year.

Tiggo 8 
The production of Tiggo 8 was revealed during the 2018 Beijing Auto Show in China, positioning the Tiggo 8 above the smaller Tiggo 7. The Tiggo 8 rides on a unibody chassis that features MacPherson struts in the front and multi-link rear suspension systems.

The engine is mated to a 6-speed dual-clutch transmission (DCT) and powerers the front wheels.

Tiggo 8 Plus 
In October 2020, the Tiggo 8 Plus was unveiled as a more upmarket version for the Chinese local market. In overseas markets, it is marketed as the Tiggo 8 Pro. The Tiggo 8 Plus sports redesigned front and rear ends with the "Life In Motion 3.0" design language and is  longer and  higher than the regular Tiggo 8. It is available as a 5-, 6- and 7-seater configurations with additional 18" and 19" redesigned alloys. The interior features dual  displays with the LION4.0 infotainment system and surround 8-speaker stereo systems supplied by Sony.

The Tiggo 8 Plus is available with a 1.6-litre turbo engine developing  and  mated to a 7-speed DCT gearbox and a mild hybrid 1.5-litre turbo engine with 48V of electric power developing a combined  and  mated to a CVT gearbox.

Tiggo 8 Pro 
The Tiggo 8 Pro name is used in several overseas market for the Chinese Tiggo 8 Plus. However, for the Chinese market, the Tiggo 8 Pro is the third variant of the Tiggo 8 product series and was launched in May 2022. The Tiggo 8 Pro features a restyled front and rear end designs with an updated interior. The Tiggo 8 Pro is powered by either a 1.6 liter TGDI turbo engine or a 2.0 liter TGDI turbo engine and Kunpeng DHT hybrid powertrains.

References

External links 

Official website
iran Official website

Tiggo 8
Cars introduced in 2018
2020s cars
Mid-size sport utility vehicles
Crossover sport utility vehicles
Front-wheel-drive vehicles
All-wheel-drive vehicles
Plug-in hybrid vehicles
Cars of China
Cars of Brazil
Latin NCAP large off-road